Roberto Mihail Alecsandru (born 13 September 1996) is a Romanian footballer who plays as a central defender for Romania club CSO Plopeni. He was promoted to the first team of Petrolul Ploiești in March 2014.

References

1996 births
Living people
Romanian footballers
People from Vălenii de Munte
Association football central defenders
FC Petrolul Ploiești players
ASC Daco-Getica București players
CS Sportul Snagov players
Liga I players
Liga II players
Liga III players